Oscar Durán (born 16 August 1980) is a Uruguayan rugby union player. He was named in Uruguay's squad for the 2015 Rugby World Cup, and later retired after the tournament.

On 23 December 2015, he was named the new scrum-forwards coach for the national side under new head coach Estebán Meneses.

References

1980 births
Living people
Uruguayan rugby union players
Uruguay international rugby union players
Rugby union players from Montevideo
Ciencias Sevilla CR players
Rugby union props